Statistics Indonesia, is a non-departmental government institute of Indonesia that is responsible for conducting statistical surveys. Its main customer is the government, but statistical data is also available to the public. Annual surveys include national and provincial socio-economics, manufacturing establishments, population and the labour force.

Established in 1960 as the Central Bureau of Statistics, the institute is directly responsible to the President of Indonesia. Its functions include providing data to other governmental institutes as well as to the public and conducting statistical surveys to publish periodic statistics on the economy, social change and development. Statistics Indonesia also assists data processing divisions in other public offices to support and to promote standard statistical methods.

History 
In February 1920, the Director of Agriculture and Trade of the government of the Dutch East Indies, established the Statistical Office based in Bogor. In March 1923, the Commission for Statistics was formed to represent members of each department. It was tasked with planning actions to ensure the achievement of unity in statistical activities in Indonesia. In June 1942, the Government of Japan reactivated statistical activities focused on meeting the needs of war or military. CKS was renamed . On 26 September 1960 the government of Indonesia enacted Law No. 7 of 1960 on Statistics replacing . Law Number 16 of 1997 concerning Statistics replaced previous laws, and based on it, the Central Bureau on Statistics became the Central Statistics Agency.

Census 

Based on Republic of Indonesia Laws No. 6 of 1960 on the Census, Statistics Indonesia organizes a census every 10 years

Demography 
A demographic census has been organized every year ending in "0" after 1961 namely in 1970, 1980, 1990, 2000, 2010 and 2020.

Economy 
An economic census is held every year ending in "6", namely 1986, 1996, 2006, and 2016.

Agriculture 
An agricultural census is held every year ending in "3", namely 1963, 1973, 1983, 1993, 2003, and 2013.

See also
 List of national and international statistical services

References

External links
  Official site

Indonesia
Government of Indonesia